Gourmet Burger Kitchen (GBK) is a chain of luxury restaurants in the United Kingdom and Ireland specialising in gourmet burgers. There is a subtle Kiwi theme throughout the restaurants, a reference to the heritage of the original owners.

History
The company was started in London by New Zealanders Adam Wills, Greg Driscoll, Brandon Allen and Ugandan Kalimali Moses, in 2001. Chef Peter Gordon, a New Zealand-born, London-based chef, oversaw the menu development and the first restaurant opened in 2001, bringing the concept of 'gourmet burgers' to London.  GBK is known for its "large" burgers, fresh produce and casual service style. The initial success of the Battersea restaurant led to further openings across London.

In 2005, the owners sold the business to Clapham House Group PLC who added a total of 53 restaurants across the UK. In 2010 the restaurant chain was sold to Capricorn Ventures, most notable for operating Nando's. GBK expanded to 60 restaurants across the UK, and has plans to continue growing. Franchises operate in Ireland, Dubai, Greece and Oman.

In September 2016, the South African firm Famous Brands bought the company for US$143.3 million. In August 2018, the company reported huge losses due to a decline in sales.

In October 2018, Gourmet Burger Kitchen reported a £47m loss amid tough trading conditions. Later that month, Gourmet Burger Kitchen announced plans to close 17 restaurants.

In October 2020, it was announced that Ranjit Singh Boparan had acquired the company from administration. However, as part of the deal, 26 restaurants would remain closed, with the loss of 362 jobs. 35 restaurants will remain open.

See also
 List of hamburger restaurants
 New Zealand cuisine

References

External links 

 

Hamburger restaurants
New Zealand cuisine
Restaurants established in 2001
Restaurants in London